Hanukkah is a Jewish holiday.

Hanukkah and its spelling variations may also refer to:

Music 
"The Chanukah Song" or "Chanuka", a 1995 song by Adam Sandler
Chanukah Suite, a chorale composition by Jason Robert Brown
"Oh Chanukah", a traditional Hanukkah song

Places 
Al Hanakah

Other uses
"Chanukah" (Rugrats), an episode of Rugrats
Hanukkah ben Obadiah, a ruler from the mid- to late ninth century CE

People with the surname
Anna Hanika (1903–1988), Austrian accounts clerk and activist
D. V. Chanaka (born 1987), Sri Lankan politician
Iris Hanika (born 1962), German writer
Karel Hanika (born 1996), motorcycle racer

People with the given name
Chanaka Amaratunga (1958–1996), founder of the Liberal Party of Sri Lanka
Chanaka Devinda (born 1997), Sri Lankan cricketer
Chanaka Komasaru (born 1983), Sri Lankan cricketer
Chanaka Ruwansiri (born 1989), Sri Lankan cricketer
Chanaka Welegedara (born 1981), Sri Lankan cricketer
Chanaka Wijesinghe (born 1982), Sri Lankan cricketer

See also
Hanukkah brisket
Hanukkah bush, a tree in honor of Hanukkah resembling a Christmas tree
Hanukkah donuts
Hanukkah Eve windstorm of 2006, a storm on the Pacific coast
Hanukkah film, film in which the main emphasis is on Hanukkah
Hanukkah gelt, chocolate coins given to children on Hanukkah
Hanukkah stamp, holiday postage stamps commemorating Hanukkah